Kawka may refer to:

Kawka, Lublin Voivodeship, Poland
Kawka, Pomeranian Voivodeship, Poland

See also
Kavka
Kafka (disambiguation)